Two Weeks Notice is a 2019 Burmese drama film, directed by  Maung Myo Min starring  Pyay Ti Oo, Wutt Hmone Shwe Yi, Min Oo, Kyaw Kyaw Bo and Aye Myat Thu.The film, produced by Film House Production premiered in Myanmar on June 20, 2019.

Cast
Pyay Ti Oo as Adipti
Wutt Hmone Shwe Yi as Mya Kyar Hmone
Min Oo as Aww Ra Tha
Kyaw Kyaw Bo as Thiha Latt
Aye Myat Thu as Yati Chan
Cho Pyone 
Ye Aung
Myo Thandar Tun

References

2019 films
2010s Burmese-language films
Burmese drama films
Films shot in Myanmar
2019 drama films